The Triumph Speed Four is a standard or streetfighter motorcycle made by Triumph from 2002 to 2006 as the naked, or non-faired brother of the TT600 sport bike introduced in 1999.

Design
The Speed Four has similar twin round headlights to the Speed Triple, but a different frame and engine. The Speed Four has the clip-on handlebars of the TT600, rather than the motocross-inspired handlebars of the Speed Triple and other streetfighters.

The Speed Four is mechanically similar to its predecessor, the TT600, with the exceptions of the cam profiles, ignition and fuel injection mapping, front spring rate, and other minor concessions to its streetfighter style; the frame and fully adjustable suspension are race-ready.

The engine is a 599 cc inline-four-cylinder engine, as used in the TT600. Motorcyclist tested the 2002 Speed Four's  time at 11.65 seconds @  and  time at 3.71 seconds.

Reception

The Speed Four was voted No.1 for handling and suspension in Ride magazine's 2008 Rider Power Survey. The Triumph Daytona 675 was second in the same category.

Productions Totals 
Triumph UK After Sales has confirmed that 4,606 Speed Fours were produced from 2002 through 2006.  Of those 1,011 were produced for the US market with a further 54 for Canada.

See also
This motorcycle has been compared to the following:
 Ducati Monster M620S
Suzuki SV650
Honda Hornet 600
Kawasaki Z750
Yamaha FZ6 
Yamaha XT660X

References

External links

Speed Four